Hymenopappus carrizoanus, the Carrizo Sands woollywhite, is a North American species of flowering plant in the daisy family. It has been found only in Texas, on the Carrizo Sands of the central part of the state.

Hymenopappus carrizoanus is a biennial herb up to 150 cm (5 feet) tall. It produces 45–60  flower heads per stem, each head with 20–40 white disc flowers but no ray flowers.

References

carrizoanus
Endemic flora of Texas
Plants described in 1989
Flora without expected TNC conservation status